(The) Sleep of Reason may refer to:

 Sleep of Reason (album), a 2013 album by Raffertie
 Sleep of Reason, a 2005 album by The Eternal
 The Sleep of Reason (Day novel), a novel by Martin Day based on the television series Doctor Who
 The Sleep of Reason (Snow novel), the tenth book in C. P. Snow's Strangers and Brothers series
 The Sleep of Reason, a 2014 horror anthology edited by Spike Trotman

See also
 The Sleep of Reason Produces Monsters, an etching by Francisco Goya